The Passion of Slow Fire is a 1961 French crime drama film directed by Édouard Molinaro and based on the novel La mort de Belle by Georges Simenon.

Cast 
 Jean Desailly - Stéphane Blanchon
 Alexandra Stewart - Belle
 Monique Mélinand - Mme. Monique Blanchon
 Yvette Etiévant - Alice, Judge's Secretary
 Jacques Monod - Judge Bechman
 Yves Robert - Bartender
 Louisa Colpeyn - Belle's Mother
 Maurice Teynac - L'ivrogne / Stephane's Friend
 Gabriel Gobin - le sergent de police Ruchet

Critical reception
The New York Times called it "an elegantly comprehensive and persuasive movie version of a Georges Simenon novel" and "concise, introspective drama," and added that "the fascination of the impeccable acting of a first-rate cast, headed by Jean Desailly, is the exquisitely restrained flow and fusion of the incidents, as the protagonist finds his soul stripped bare." The reviewer also praised "director Edouard Molinaro's austere pacing" and wrote that "the adaptation by Jean Anouilh, the playwright, is so visual that it absorbs some brief flashbacks and the protagonist's occasional narration like a sponge." TV Guide described it as "an entertaining crime drama from a novel by the masterful Georges Simenon."

References

External links 

1961 crime drama films
1961 films
Films based on works by Georges Simenon
Films with screenplays by Jean Anouilh
Films set in Switzerland
Films shot in Switzerland
French crime drama films
1960s French films